Athlete of the Year is an award given by various sports organizations for the athlete whom they have determined to be deserving of such recognition.

Definition of "athlete"

In many nations, an "athlete" primarily refers to someone who participates in the various disciplines of athletics (track and field, racewalking, cross country and road running)
In other nations — including Canada and the United States — an "athlete" equals "sportsperson" (from any sport).

Similar names for the award
The awards have various titles, examples include "Player of the Year" and "Sportspersonality of the Year". In the United States, several states choose a simple "Mr." or "Miss" prefix, such as Mr. Basketball (Illinois, Indiana, Iowa, Kentucky, Michigan, North Dakota, Utah, and Wisconsin). Such awards — general and one-sport-only — are common at the high-school, college (university), and professional levels in the United States.

List of athlete of the year awards

Athletics (track and field)
World's Greatest Athlete (decathlon for men, heptathlon for women)
World Athlete of the Year (World Athletics formerly known as the IAAF)
European Athlete of the Year (European Athletic Association)
Track & Field News Athlete of the Year
The Bowerman (collegiate track & field's athlete of the year)

All sports
Worldwide
Awards with deliberate global scope, consistently nominating an international mix of athletes
Laureus World Sports Award for Sportsman of the Year (Laureus World Sports Academy)
Laureus World Sports Award for Sportswoman of the Year
L'Équipe Champion of Champions—excludes French nationals
BBC Overseas Sports Personality of the Year—excludes British nationals
United Press International Athlete of the Year Award
United States Sports Academy Athlete of the Year

Continental
European Sportsperson of the Year

Regional
BTA Best Balkan Athlete of the Year

Nationwide
Awards that focus (either predominantly or exclusively) on sportspersons from the host country

Algeria Best Athletes of the Year

Olimpia Award

AIS Athlete of the Year

Austrian Sportspersonality of the year

Belgian Sportsman of the year

Bosnia and Herzegovina Sportsperson of the Year

Prêmio Brasil Olímpico

Bulgarian Sportsperson of the Year

Lou Marsh Trophy (athlete of the year, of either sex)
Lionel Conacher Award (male athlete of the year)
Bobbie Rosenfeld Award (female athlete of the year)
Velma Springstead Trophy (female athlete of the year)
Tom Longboat Awards (indigenous athletes)

Sportske novosti awards

Sportsperson of the Year

Danish Sports Name of the Year

Estonian Sportspersonality of the year

Finnish Sports Personality of the Year

L'Équipe Champion of Champions

German Sportspersonality of the Year

PSAT Sports Awards

Hungarian Sportspeople of the Year

Icelandic Sportsperson of the Year

Khel Ratna Award 

Iran Sportsperson of the year

RTÉ Sports Person of the Year

Jamaica Sportsman and Sportswoman of the Year

Japan Professional Sports Grand Prize

Kenyan Sports Personality of the Year

Latvian Sportspersonality of the year

Lithuanian Sportsman of the Year

Luxembourgish Sportspeople of the Year

Anugerah Sukan Negara for Sportsman of the Year
Anugerah Sukan Negara for Sportswoman of the Year

Moldovan Sportsman of the year

Sportsperson of the Year

Dutch Sportsman of the year

Halberg Awards

Norwegian Sportsperson of the Year

PSA Sportsman of the Year

Polish Sportspersonality of the Year

CDP Awards

Golden badge Sport—athlete of the year 

Sportsperson of the Year

Slovenian Sportsman of the year

South African Sportsperson of the Year

Premios Nacionales del Deporte

Svenska Dagbladet Gold Medal
Radiosportens Jerringpris
Svenska idrottsgalan

Swiss Sports Personality of the Year

Heroes of Sports Year

BBC Sports Personality of the Year Award
BBC Northern Ireland Sports Personality of the Year
BBC Scotland Sports Personality of the Year
BBC Wales Sports Personality of the Year

The presence of "Sportsman" in the name doesn't imply that the award is open solely to men; women have frequently won these awards.
Associated Press Athlete of the Year (AP)
Best Female Athlete ESPY Award
Best Male Athlete ESPY Award
Sporting News Sportsman/Pro Athlete of the Year
Sports Illustrated Sportsperson of the Year
USOC Athlete of the Year
Sportswoman of the Year Award (Women's Sports Foundation)
United Press International Athlete of the Year Award (UPI) (defunct)
NCAA Woman of the Year Award (student-athlete)
Best Female College Athlete ESPY Award
Best Male College Athlete ESPY Award
Atlantic Coast Conference Athlete of the Year (ACC)

Vanuatu Sports Awards

Defunct

Czechoslovakia Sportsperson of the Year

Soviet Union top ten athletes of the year

DSL Sport Golden Badge Best Athlete
Sportske novosti Athlete of the Year

One sport (other than track and field)
International Baseball Federation Senior Athlete of the Year
U.S. Soccer Athlete of the Year (U.S. Soccer Federation) (association football)
Golden Year Award at association football, Neymar last winner
Leigh Matthews Trophy (Australian Football League) (Australian rules football)
Canadian Football League Most Outstanding Player Award (Canadian football)
GAA All Stars Awards (Gaelic games)
All Stars Footballer of the Year (Gaelic football)
All Stars Hurler of the Year (hurling)
Ladies' Gaelic football All Stars Awards (Ladies' Gaelic football)
Camogie All Stars Awards (camogie)
Rounders All Stars Awards (rounders)
National Football League Most Valuable Player Award (U.S.) (American football)
Nippon Professional Baseball Most Valuable Player Award (Japan)
MLB Most Valuable Player Award (Major League Baseball) (U.S. & Canada)
Players Choice Awards Player of the Year (Major League Baseball) (U.S. & Canada)
Sporting News Player of the Year (Major League Baseball) (U.S. & Canada)
Sporting News MLB Athlete of the Decade (Major League Baseball) (U.S. & Canada)
ACC Men's Basketball Player of the Year (Atlantic Coast Conference) (college/university) (U.S.)
Baseball America High School Player of the Year Award (U.S.)

See also
Rookie of the Year (award)

Footnotes

Most valuable player awards
Sports trophies and awards